Zala Kuštrin (born 18 June 1998) is a Slovenian footballer who plays as a midfielder and has appeared for the Slovenia women's national team.

Career
Kuštrin has been capped for the Slovenia national team, appearing for the team during the 2019 FIFA Women's World Cup qualifying cycle.

References

External links
 
 
 

1998 births
Living people
Slovenian women's footballers
Slovenia women's international footballers
Women's association football midfielders
ŽNK Radomlje players